Elreta Melton Alexander-Ralston (19 March 1919 - 14 March 1998) was a mid-twentieth-century black female American lawyer and judge in North Carolina at a time when there were only a handful of practicing female or black lawyers in that state. With an unusual career as a trial attorney and North Carolina District Court Judge, she has been noted for her “refusal to allow the circumstances of her birth, the realities of her time, and the limitations imposed by others define her destiny.” However, notwithstanding her accomplishments, Judge Alexander's legacy has remained largely unrecognized and her story untold. This confirms the notion that black women lawyers have received minimal universal recognition for their accomplishments and contributions to the legal profession.

Personal life 
Elreta Narcissus Melton was born on March 21, 1919, in the small eastern North Carolina town of Smithfield. Her father, Joseph C. Melton, was a Baptist minister and teacher, and her mother, Alian A. Reynolds Melton, was a schoolteacher. Alexander's father strongly insisted that each of his children receive a college education, as he believed “education was essential to equip his family for life” and entrenched this belief in each of his family members. Along with her parents’ strong beliefs about the importance of education, Alexander's parents also refused to perpetuate racial injustice by prohibiting their children from riding segregated buses or otherwise partaking in segregation.

After spending about twelve years in Danville, Virginia, where Alexander spent much of her young life, the family returned to North Carolina, this time to the bustling metropolis of Greensboro. In 1937, at the age of eighteen, Alexander graduated from North Carolina Agricultural & Technical College (now North Carolina Agricultural and Technical State University) in Greensboro with a Bachelor of Science degree in music. Upon graduation, she became a high-school teacher in South Carolina, where she met Girardeau “Tony” Alexander II, a physician who soon became her husband.  They married in Asheboro, North Carolina on June 7, 1938. The couple had one son, Girardeau Alexander III (born Oct. 4, 1950).  Elreta and Dr. Girardeau Alexander were divorced March 12, 1968. Elreta married retired IRS official John D. Ralston on August 23, 1979.

Judge Elreta Alexander-Ralston died on March 14, 1998, at the age of seventy-eight, one week shy of her seventy-ninth birthday. She requested there be no funeral, and her ashes were buried in a small grove behind a nursing home in Greensboro.

Legal career

Law school 
Due to the limited access to law schools in North Carolina for black women  and to her husband's insistence, Alexander applied and was the first black woman admitted to Columbia Law School in 1943 at the age of twenty-four. The significance of this achievement is highlighted by the fact that only three black students, all men, had been admitted before her. While initially viewing her legal education as something to “pass the time,” she eventually warmed up to the idea of seriously pursuing a legal career, grew increasingly popular among the student body, and became the first black woman to graduate from Columbia Law School in 1945.

Trial attorney 
In 1947, after passing the North Carolina bar exam, Alexander became the first black woman to practice law in North Carolina. However, it is important to note that Ruth Whitehead Whaley was the first black woman admitted to the North Carolina bar, but she never practiced in the state. After establishing a large solo criminal practice in Greensboro in which she frequently challenged the status quo (for instance, by representing a white client), Alexander formed one of the first integrated law firms in the South, Alston, Alexander, Pell & Pell. During her career as a trial attorney, she added to her list of “firsts” when she became the first black woman to argue before the Supreme Court of North Carolina.

District court judge 
In November 1968, Alexander became the first black judge elected in North Carolina, and the first black woman to be elected a district court judge anywhere in the United States. She ran for election to the District Court as a Republican in order to increase her chances of victory, and because she “felt that the Democratic Party was unresponsive to the needs of African Americans.” Alexander, running unopposed, was subsequently re-elected in 1972, 1976 and 1980. One of her most notable accomplishments as a District Court Judge was “Judgment Day,” her innovative juvenile sentencing approach, which focused on rehabilitating young offenders and misdemeanants. Judge Alexander ran for the Republican nomination for the Chief Justice position on the North Carolina Supreme Court in 1974. She lost to James Newcomb, a fire extinguisher salesman with no college degree or legal background; however, her loss prompted a later-adopted constitutional amendment requiring judges be attorneys licensed in North Carolina.

See also 
 List of African-American jurists
 List of first women lawyers and judges in North Carolina

References 

Lil Thompson, "First N.C. Black Judge, Funny Times Came; So Did Her Only Tears in Court", Winston-Salem J. 32, (September 13, 1984)
Nancy H. McLaughlin, "Judge Ushered in a New Day for Greensboro", Greensboro News & Record, June 14, 1999, in A5
Emily Colin & Lynn P. Roundtree, N.C. BAR ASS’N, THE CHANGING FACE OF JUSTICE: A LOOK AT THE FIRST 100 WOMEN ATTORNEYS IN NORTH CAROLINA, 64 (2004).
Constance Baker Motley, Reflections, 102 COLUM. L. REV. 1449, 1449 (2002)
See "High Court Upholds Negroes Asking Entry Rights at UNC", Raleigh News & Observer, June 5, 1951, at A1. (UNC School of Law did not admit black students until required to do so in 1951 by a federal court order); see also Duke Law School Website found at http://www.law.duke.edu/history/timeline (Duke Law School did not admit black students until 1961); see also Wake Forest University Website found at https://alumni.wfu.edu/whats_new/viewer.php?edition=27 (Wake Forest Law School did not admit black students until 1962).
Eleanor Kennedy, "New Judge Reluctant Pioneer", Greensboro Daily News, December 1, 1968, at E1
J. Clay Smith, Jr., Black Women Lawyers: 125 Years at the Bar; 100 Years in the Legal Academy, 40 HOW. L. J. 365, 378 (1997) (hereinafter Smith) (noting the general unawareness about the role black women lawyers have played in American law and the “dearth of studies solely on black women lawyers and their status in the black community and within the legal structure.”  Smith attributes this to the dual subjugation of black women: being black and female); see also Charles H. Houston, "The Need for Negro Lawyers", 4 J. Negro Educ. 49 (January 1935).
North Carolina Lives: The Tar Heel Who's Who 9 (William S. Powell, ed., Historical Record Association 1962)).
Virginia L. Summey, "Elreta Melton Alexander Ralston," https://www.ncpedia.org/ralston-elreta-melton-alexander

1919 births
1998 deaths
African-American women lawyers
African-American lawyers
African-American judges
Columbia Law School alumni
North Carolina lawyers
North Carolina A&T State University alumni
20th-century American lawyers
20th-century American judges
20th-century American women lawyers
20th-century American women judges
20th-century African-American women
20th-century African-American people